Aaron Young (born 1972) is an American artist based in New York City. Young's work became known when MoMA purchased video documentation of his student project involving a motorcyclist repeatedly cycling around the San Francisco Art Institute.

Early life and education
Young was born in Salinas, California Where he attended Salinas High School (Class of 1990). He earned a Bachelor of Fine Arts from San Francisco Art Institute and a Master of Fine Arts from Yale School of Art.

Career
Young works in sculpture, performance, photography and drawing.

Young is influenced by his former professor, Tony Labat, and the dangerous performance work carried out by Chris Burden in the 1960s.

Solo exhibitions

2011
 ALWAYS FOREVER NOW, Almine Rech, Paris, France
 SPIT & FIGHT CURSE & BITE, Carlson/Massimo de Carlo, London, UK
 BUILT TOUGH, Bortolami Gallery, New York, NY

2010	
 Museo Civico Diocesano of Santa Maria dei Servi, Città della Pieve (PG) Italy
 MACRO (Museo d’Arte Contemporanea), Rome, Italy
 Teatro di Marcello, Rome, Italy
 Repeat Offender, Kukje Gallery, Seoul, Korea
 THE RIGHT WAY TO DO WRONG, Gagosian Gallery, Los Angeles

2009	
 SEMPER IDEM, Galerie Almine Rech, Brussels
 Pan Museum, Naples
 Galerie Almine Rech, Paris

2008	
 PUNCHLINE, Bortolami Gallery, New York
 Arc Light, Moscow, Gagosian Gallery, Moscow
 Smoke Flows in all Directions, Naples, Italy
 Pit Stop, Tit Stop, The Fireplace Project, East Hampton, NY

2007	
 Greeting Card, Park Avenue Armory

2006	
 Art Positions, Art Basel Miami Beach, Florida
 1%, Harris Lieberman, New York
 Aaron Young, Kunst-Werke, Berlin, Germany (catalogue)

2005	
 Kick the Dog, Herzilya Museum of Contemporary Art, Herzilya, Israel (catalogue)
 Never Work (Bootlegs and other operations), Sister Gallery, Los Angeles

2004	
 Tender Buttons, Midway Contemporary Art, Minneapolis

Group exhibitions

2012
	
 Rebel, Museum of Contemporary Art, Los Angeles, CA

2011	

 Fresh Kills, Anonymous Gallery, Mexico City
 George Herms : Xenophilia (Love of the Unknown), curated by Neville Wakefield, MOCA Pacific Design Center, Los Angeles
 Post 9-11, OHWOW, Los Angeles, CA
 With One Color, curated by Paul McCabe, Van de Weghe Fine Art, New York, NY
 California Dreamin - Myths And Legends Of Los Angeles, Curated by Hedi Slimane, Galerie Almine Rech, Paris, France

2010	

 Yotta Paintings, Massimo De Carlo, Milan, Italy
 Exhibition Exhibition, curated by Adam Carr, Castello di Rivoli, Turin, Italy
 Re-Dressing, Bortolami Gallery, New York
 Celebration 8, Macedonian Museum of Contemporary Art, Athens
 I WANT TO SEE HOW YOU SEE, Julia Stoschek Collection, Dichtor Hallen Aktuelle Kunst Haus Der Photographie, Hamburg
 Brucennial, curated by Vito Schnabel, New York
 Wall & Floor, Galerie Almine Rech, Paris, France
 Light Breaks Where No Sun Shines, Bortolami Gallery at The Webster, Miami

2009	

 IT AIN’T FAIR 2009, OHWOW, Miami Beach
 Rotating Views #2 - Works from the Astrup Fearnley Collection, Astrup Fearnley Museum Modern Art, Oslo, Norway
 Play, Paradise Row, in collaboration with Prakke Contemporary, London
 100 Years (Version #2, PS1) Julia Stoschek Foundation, PS1, New York
 Spite House, Lawrimore Project, Seattle, WA
 Abstract America: New Painting and Sculpture, Saatchi Gallery, London
 The End, The Andy Warhol Museum, Pittsburgh, PA
 Fragile, Julia Stoschek Collection, Düsseldorf, Germany

2008	

 Political/Minimal, curated by Klaus Biesenbach, KW Institute for Contemporary Art, Berlin and The Muzeum Sztuki in Lodz, Poland, 2009
 The Unforgiven, Stellan Holm Gallery, NY
 Off, Off Bowery, Curators Aaron Bondaroff & Jen Brill, Chez Colette, Paris, France
 For What You Are About To Receive, Red October Chocolate Factory, Moscow, Russia
 Shaping a space II, Mário Sequeira Gallery, Braga, Portugal
 Murder Letters, Galeria Filomena Soares, Lisbon, Portugal
 United Artist Ltd., Marfa, TX
 Substraction, Deitch Projects, New York, curated by Nicola Vassell

2007

 Pop Art is: Gagosian Gallery, London
 Invisible Colours, Marian Goodman, Paris
 Uncertain States of America, Rudolfinum Gallery, Prague, Czech Republic
 Grups, Hydra School Project, Hydra, Greece
 No.1: Destroy she said, Julia Stoschek Collection, Düsseldorf, Germany
 Beneath the Underdog, Gagosian Gallery, curated by Nate Lowman and Adam McEwen (catalogue)
 Last Attraction, Next Exit, Max Wigram Gallery, London
 Dark Victory, Ileana Tounta Contemporary, Athens
 Uncertain States of America, CSW Centrum Sztuki, Wspolczesneij/Center for Contemporary Art Ujazdowski Castle, Warsaw, Poland
 Uncertain States of America, Herning Kunstmuseum, Herning, Denmark
 ParisStop Jalouse Magazine, Palais de Tokyo, Paris
 Works from the Berezdivin collection, Museo de Arte de Puerto Rico, Puerto Rico
 2nd Moscow Biennale for Contemporary Art, Moscow

2006

 The Show will be open when the show will be closed….,
 View (Eleven): Upstate, Curated by Amy Smith-Stewart, Mary Boone Gallery, New York
 Uncertain States of America, Serpentine Gallery, London, U.K.
 Yes Bruce Nauman, Zwirner & Wirth, New York
 Uncertain States of America, American Art in the Third Millennium, Hessel Museum of Art & Center for Curatorial Studies Galleries at Bard College, New York, NY, U.S.A.
 Whitney Biennial 2006, Whitney Museum of American Art, New York
 Action, FRAC PACA, Marseille, France
 The Show Will Be Open When The Show Will Be Closed, Curated by Adam Carr, STORE gallery and various locations, London and the Kadist Art Foundation, Paris
Survivor, Curated by David Rimanelli, Bortolami Dayan, New York

 Mid-Life Crisis, Salander-O’Reilly, New York
 Montezuma’s Revenge, Nicole Klagsbrun, New York
 Globalizacion: indicaciones/efectos secundarios/advertencias, Espacio 1414, Santurce, Puerto Rico

2005	

 Uncertain States Of America, curated by Hans Ulrich Obrist, Daniel Birnbaum and Gunnar B. Kvaran, Museum of Modern Art, Oslo, Norway; traveling to Reykjavik Museum of Art; Center for Curatorial Studies, Bard College, Annandale-on-Hudson, New York; Serpentine Gallery, London; Centre of Contemporary Art, Warsaw; Moscow; Musee de Sérignan, Sérignan and Songzhuang Art Center, Beijing (catalogue)
 NEW ART. NEW YORK: Reflections on the Human Condition, Traun and Salzburg, Austria
(catalogue)

 DAY LABOR, P.S.1/MOMA Long Island City, NY (catalogue)
 NEW PHOTOGRAPHY, JJC Museum, Kansas City, KS (catalogue)
 New Acquisitions, Museum of Modern Art, New York
 Bridge Freeze Before Road, Barbara Gladstone Gallery, New York (catalogue)
 Sticks and Stones, Perry Rubenstein Gallery, New York
 Greater New York 2005, P.S.1/MOMA, Long Island City, (catalogue)
 Withdrawal, Galerie Chez Valentin, Paris
 PREMIERES, Museum Of Modern Art, New York
 Curatorial Choices: Drawing, University of Minnesota Museum, St. Paul, MN

2004 	

 Always Already Passé, Gavin Brown Enterprises @ Passerby, New York
 Some Exhaust, Lehmann Maupin Gallery, New York
 Let The Bullshit Run A Marathon, Nicole Klagsbrun Gallery, New York
 Miami Heat, Pacemaker, Gallery Miami, FL

2003	

 From Here On, Guild & Greyshkul Gallery, New York
 Circus, 8th Havana Bienal, Havana, Cuba

2002	

 Cinco Artistas Jovenes de Diferentes Paises, Galeria Luis Andelatado, Valencia, Spain

2001	

 New Orleans Performance Festival, New Orleans
 Strictly Ballroom, Stanford University Museum, Palo Alto, California

2000	

 Paladar, 7th Havana Bienal, Cuba

Lectures

2011	San Francisco Art Institute, CA

Museum collections
Los Angeles County Museum of Art
Museum of Modern Art, New York
Astrup Fearnley Museum for Moderne Kunst
JJC Oppenheimer Fund
Jumex, Mexico City

Honors and awards
The Chancey McKeever Award, Walker Art Center, Minneapolis
The New Genres Award, San Francisco Art Institute

Publications

 ART: Aaron Young The Rake December 2004
 Dunham, Carla Ruth Aaron Young at Midway Contemporary Art Arts US March–April 2005
 Gardner, James Greater New York The Post March 2005
 Gorgon Irreverent Truths Artnet.com March 2005
 Miles, Christopher Exhibitionism: Greater New York Flaunt No. 63, April 2005
 Kley, Elizabeth Greater New York 2005 Art News May 2005
 Rimanelli, David Greater New York 2005 Artforum May 2005
 Aaron Young at Midway Contemporary Art Contemporary July 2005
 The Renegades  W Magazine January 2006, pp. 222–36
 Goldfine, Gil Menace of the Forest The Jerusalem Post. February 17, 2006
 McCormick, Carlo What to Look For in the Whitney Biennial Artnet February 23, 2006
 Rosenberg, Karen Ready to Watch New York Magazine February 27, 2006
 Cotter, Holland Midlife Crisis The New York Times, 23 June 2006
 Searle, Adrian Rebels without a cause The Guardian, September 12, 2006
 Mendehlson, Adam E. Aaron Young: 1% Time Out New York, September 28, 2006
 Cotter, Holland Aaron Young: 1% The New York Times, 6 October 2006
 Honigman, Ani Finel New York Horticulture Artnet, October 2006
 Saltz, Jerry All Art is Contemporary Art Modern Painters, November 2006
 Banai, Nuit Review: Aaron Young Modern Painters, December 2006
 Clintberg, Mark Art Positions: Writing in Sand The Art Newspaper, 7 December 2006
 Robinson, Walter Miami Heat Artnet, December 8, 2006
 Smith, Roberta More Than You Can See: Storm of Art Engulfs Miami The New York Times, 9 December 2006
 Stillman, Nick Review: Aaron Young Artforum, December 2006
 We Brake for the Armory The New York Times, 20 July 2007
 Full Cycle The New Yorker, 13 August 2007
 Tough Guys Don’t Paint Men’s Vogue September 2007
 Vogel, Carol After Test Runs, an Armory Is Ready to Declare, ‘Artists, Start Your Engines’ The New York Times, 17 September 2007
 Smith, Roberta Art in Review: Aaron Young, Greeting Card The New York Times, 21 September 2007
 Bollen, Christopher UES Motocross New York Magazine, 1 October 2007
 Allsop, Laura Substraction Art Review, June 2008
 Aaron Young in “Smoke Flows in All Directions” Caserta News, 21 September 2008
 Mazria-Katz, Marisa Russian Evolution on a Factory Floor Financial Times, 22 September 2008
 Marino, Fuani Aaron Young Corriere della Sera, 23 September 2008
 Renata Caragliano and Stella Cervasio Aaron Young, l’Artista Spericolato La Repubblica, 24 September 2008
 Sutton, Kate Red Planet Artforum.com, 26 September 2008
 Pittura d’Azione, la Poesia in Flussi di Fumo e Giravolte di Calore, Il Roma, 26 September
 Aaron Young al Volcano Solfatara Arte e Critica, September 2008
 Trione, Vincenzo Young, l’Effimero Si Fa Spettacolo Il Mattino, 27 September 2008
 Performances Exibart.pdf, 28 September 2008
 Aaron Young: Smoke Flows in All Directions RAI Regione Campania, 29 September 2008
 Aaron Young: Smoke Flows in All Directions Arte.go, 29 September 2008
 Motociclisti alla Solatara: “Pittura d’Azione” Sotto le Ruote Leggo, 29 September 2008
 Kim, Sebastian Aaron Young Interview, October 2008
 Douglas, Sarah A Bright Flame Art + Auction. October 2008
 Pigozzi Multitasking Vanity Fair (Italia), 1 October 2008
 Resoconto: Aaron Young Exibart.com, 7 October 2008
 Taylor, Alex Thursday Art Crawl: Two Shows Tonight The New York Observer, 13 November 2008
 Vallora, Marco Aaron Young, la Texture dell’Apocalisse Cronache di Liberal, 15 November 2008
 Fabiola Santiago and Jane Wooldridge Slow But Steady Opening for VIPs at Art Basel MiamiHerald.com, 4 December 2008
 Rosenberg, Karen Aaron Young, Punchline The New York Times, 5 December 2008
 Bones Bones’ Beat: Aaron Young at Bortolami Gallery The Village Voice, 11 December 2008
 Obrist, Hans Ulrich Aaron Young: Warhol’s Child Flash Art, January 2009
 Phillips, Owen Aaron Young Flash Art, March 2009
 Hugon, Francois “I Was Surprised It Went So Fast”: Aaron Young Intersection, Spring 2009
 Valloire, Delphine De Bruit et de Fureur. Créateur en Roue Libre Jalouse (Galerie Almine Rech), April 2009
 Schmit, Sophie Expositions Parisiennes: Entrées Libres 30 April 2009
 Céh, Yan Forever Young Blast (Galerie Almine Rech), 20 May 2009
 Wullschlager, Jackie “Abstract America” at Saatchi Gallery Financial Times, 30 May 2009
 Jones, Laura K. Paris Dispatch Artnet.com
 Searle, Adrian Review: The Saatchi’s Art Exhibition Abstract America is Stupid Stuff Turned Out Smart, Guardian.co.uk, 2 June 2009
 Abstract America: New Painting and Sculpture on view at the Saatchi Gallery Artdaily.org, 4 June 2009
 Aaron Young, The Parisian, 17 June 2009
 Hackett, Regina Spite¬-The Art Version ArtsJournal.com19 August 2009
 Daly, Ian Artistic License, Details Magazine, April 2010 ill pg 89-92.
 Mooney, Christopher, Hellraiser, ArtReview, January/February 2010
 Williams, Maxwell, Aaron Young, Assessing Contentment Through The Collaborative Processes, Flaunt Magazine, 2010 ill. Pg 42 -43.
 Il Macro punta sul 7: Da Aaron Young fino a Jacob Hashimoto, Corriere della Sera, April 28, 2010
 Marocco, Terry, Più che un segno, lascerò una sgommata, Panorama, June 3, 2010
 Aaron Young. You can run but you can’t hide, Umbriacity.it, July 12, 2010
 Gaymer, Dann, Aaron Young; Jackson Pollock Meets the Hell’s Angels, Eloquence, July 2010
 A.D.D. Attention Deficit Disorder, Abitare, September 2010
 Perra, Daniele, Aaron Young, Kult, September 2010
 Ng, David, Jefferey Deitch Welcomes You to His Posh L.A. House, Los Angeles Times, October 28, 2010

See also
Patrick Hill (artist)
Piotr Janas
Avner Ben-Gal
Richard Aldrich (artist)

References

External links
Aaron Young is represented by Bortolami, NY: Gagosian; Massimo de Carlo, Milan and London; Almine Rech Gallery, Paris and Brussels

Rosenberg, Karen, Ready To Watch: Ten Young Artists With Staying Power, NYMag.com
Aaron Young on ArtFacts.net
Further information from the Saatchi Gallery
Aaron Young and Eric Shiner discuss getting older, the globalized art world, and more Man of The World Magazine

American artists
Yale School of Art alumni
San Francisco Art Institute alumni
1972 births
Living people